Santiago de la Frontera is a city and municipality in the Santa Ana department of El Salvador.

References 

Municipalities of the Santa Ana Department